The 9th All-Africa Games took place between 11 and 23 July 2007 in Algiers, the capital city of Algeria. Algiers is the first city to hold All-Africa Games for a second time. The 1978 All-Africa Games were held there. Besides Algeria, only Nigeria has hosted the event twice, but with different host cities. 4793 athletes took part to these games.

Venues

Main stadium - Athletics
Stade SATO - Para athletics
Piscine du Complexe Olympique - Swimming
Hall OMS El Biar - Badminton
Salle OMS Hydra - Women's Basketball
Salle Staouali - Men's Basketball
Salle Harcha - Men's Basketball
Centre Equestre LIDO - Equestrian
Centre Equestre de Maramene - Equestrian (Endurance)
Stand de tir Chenoua - Shooting
Salle OMS de Bordj-El-Kiffan - Boxing
Coupole - Judo, Karate, Handball
Salle OMS de Bousmail - Weightlifting
Club Tennis OCO - Tennis
Salle OMS Boumerdes - Kickboxing, Taekwondo
Barrage de Boukerdane - Rowing
Salle OMS de Rouiba - Table tennis
Salle De Bab Ezzouar - Gymnastics
La Cité des sciences, Théâtre des verdures - Chess
Salles OMS Ain Benian - Handball
Salles OMS Ain Taya - Handball
Salles OMS Tipaza - Handball
Salle de Boufarik - Wheelchair basketball
Circuit route Tipaza - Cycling
Salle de Zeralda - Goalball
E.N.V Alger plage - Sailing

Competitions 
The following 24 sports were competed:

Paralympic sports: Athletics, Basketball and Goalball

Three disciplines, Baseball, Softball and Field Hockey were dropped by the hosts, since these sports are hardly played in Algeria and consequently lack suitable facilities. The hockey competition would have doubled as qualifier for the 2008 Summer Olympics in Beijing, thus African Hockey Federation organised a separate olympic qualifying tournament in Nairobi, Kenya, held simultaneously with the All-Africa Games.

Water Polo was not competed due to lack of teams. It was supposed to be an Olympic qualifier.

Medals

References

External links 
Association of National Olympic Committees of Africa (ANOCA)
Competition schedule (French)
General programme (French)

 
All-Africa Games
All-Africa Games
A
Multi-sport events in Algeria
21st century in Algiers
African Games
July 2007 sports events in Africa